The City School (abbreviated as TCS) is an education company established in 1978, which operates English medium primary and secondary with over 160 schools in 49 cities across Pakistan along with joint venture projects in UAE, Saudi Arabia, Philippines and Malaysia. It is one of the largest private educational organisations in Pakistan, with a total of 150,000 students enrolled as of 2018. In 2018, The City School celebrated 40 years of service in the education industry of Pakistan.

Its primary school is based on curriculum derived from the UK's National Curriculum, while its secondary school education is divided between the local Pakistani curriculum and the Cambridge regulated international GCE programs. Founded in Karachi in 1978, the school's head office is based in Karachi  with regional offices in Karachi and Lahore.

Campuses and Branches 
Some of the prominent campuses are:

Head Office 

 31-Industrial Area, Gurumangat Road, Gulberg III, Lahore, Pakistan.

Southern Region

Karachi 

 PAF Chapter is located at Shaheed-e-Millat Extension, Off Shahrah-e-Faisal, Karachi. It is a co-educational campus and offers education from Playgroup to A Level.
Darakhshan Campus located at Kayabane-e-Bukhari is a co-educational campus, From class 4 to O Level.
PECHS Campus located in Mehmoodabad

Gulshan Network 
 Gulshan Campus A (GCA) is a boys campus located at PB 4, Block B N.C.E.C.H.S Block 10-A Gulshan-e-Iqbal, Karachi. It offers education from grades 7 to 11 (O-Levels) and 9th grade Matriculation.
 Gulshan Campus B is located at PB 4, Block B N.C.E.C.H.S Block 10-A Gulshan-e-Iqbal, Karachi. It is a co-educational campus and offers education from playgroup to grade 8.
 Gulshan Junior Campus is located at E-61, 62, Block 7 Gulshan-e-Iqbal, Karachi. It is a co-educational campus and offers education from grades 3 to 5, rumors of The City school converting it into a boys only campus starting from grade 6 ending at an unknown grade have spread.
 Gulshan Campus C is located at ST-4A, Block 7, Gulshan-e-Iqbal, Karachi. It is a girls only branch. It offers education from grades 6 to 11 (O-Levels).
 Gulshan A Level Campus: is a branch for students who opt for A Level. It is located at E-21/22, Block 7, Gulshan-e-Iqbal.
 Other branches in Gulshan Network: Gulshan Junior A, Gulshan Junior B, Gulshan Junior C, Gulshan Junior D, Gulshan Junior E and Gulshan Junior F.

North Nazimabad Network 
North Nazimabad Junior Boys located at F- 73, Block B, North Nazimabad 
North Nazimabad Prep Girls located at F-126/I, Block F, North Nazimabad
North Nazimabad Senior Girls located at F - 126, Block F, North Nazimabad
North Nazimabad Boys Campus located at D-28, D-29, Block 'D' North Nazimabad
Other branches include North Nazimabad The City Nursery I, North Nazimabad The City Nursery II, North Nazimabad Junior A, North Nazimabad Junior B, North Nazimabad Junior C.

Hyderabad 

 Jinnah Campus, Qasimabad, Hyderabad. Coeducational branch; Playgroup to O/A Levels and SSC/HSC.
 Liaquat Campus, Kohsar, Hyderabad. Coeducational Branch; Playgroup to O Levels and SSC/HSC.

Sukkur 

 Indus Campus Sukkur is purpose built campus offering Playgroup to O Level and Matric

Central Region

Lahore 

 DHA Campus is located at 296-B, Phase-VI, DHA Lahore Gulberg III. It offers education from Playgroup to O/A Levels.
 Shalimar Campus is a branch located at 32 Industrial Area, Gurumangat Road, Gulberg III. It offers education from Class 1 to O Level and Matric.
 Paragon Campus is a co educational branch located at Plot No.33, Paragon City, Barki Road, Lahore. It offers education from Playgroup to O Levels
Ravi Campus is a coeducational branch located at 303/304 Block H-III, Johar Town. It offers education from Playgroup to A Levels, including GCE O, AS and A Levels.
 Gulberg Nursery Branch
Gulberg A-Level Campus
Iqbal Town Campus is a coeducational branch located at 143 Rachna Block, Allama Iqbal Town. It offers education from Playgroup to Class 2.
 Model Town Junior Campus is a coeducational branch located at 12 Block B Model Town. It offers education from Playgroup to Grade IV.
 Model Town Campus is a coeducational branch located at 202 Block M, Model Town. It offers education from Playgroup to Class 11, including GCE O Levels.
 Shadman Nursery Branch
Muslim Town Campus is divided into branches, 100-A that offers education from Playgroup to (class 2 for girls) Class 5(coeducational), 105-A is boys branch that offers education from class 6 to GCE O Levels class 11 and 110-A is girls branch that offers education from class 3 to GCE O Levels class 11.
 Model Town Link Road Campus is a coeducational branch located at Peco Road, Township Lahore. It offers education from Playgroup to O Level and Matric.

Faisalabad 

Chenab Campus is offering education from playgroup to A Level and Matric.

Northern Region

Islamabad 

 Capital Campus, Islamabad is located at Pitras Bokhari Road (H-8) and is offering education from class 1 to A Level.
 E-11 Campus is offering education from playgroup to A Level. After Class 8, students have the option to choose between Matric and GCE O Level.

Chakwal 

Chakwal campus is offering education from Playgroup to O Level.Located at Talagang road near PAF Base Murid

Curriculum

Preschool and Class 1-5 

ICT
Arts
English
Social Studies
Islamiyat
Mathematics
Music
Science
Physical Education
Urdu

Class 6-8 
English
Geography
History
ICT
Islamiyat
Mathematics
Physical Education
Science
Urdu

Class 9-11 (O Level)

Compulsory 

English
Islamiat
Mathematics
Pakistan Studies
Urdu

Electives: Science 

Biology
Chemistry
Computer Studies
Physics
Additional Mathematics Optional

Electives: Commerce 

Business Studies
Economics
Accounting Since 2020
Additional Mathematics Optional

Electives: Humanities 

Art and Design
Fashion and Design
Food and Nutrition
Home Management

Class A-1 and A-2 (AS/A Level)

Science Group

Pre-Medical 
Biology
Chemistry
Physics

IT 
Physics
Mathematics
 Applied ICT

Pre-Engineering 
Physics
Mathematics
Further Mathematics Pure Mathematics
Chemistry

Business Accounting

Group I 
Economics
Accounting
Business Studies
URDU

Group II 
Mathematics
Accounting
Business Studies
Computing

Group III 
Mathematics
Accounting
Business Studies
Computing
Economics

Other Subjects 
Art and Design
General Paper
Law
Psychology
Sociology
Urdu
Media Studies
History
Critical Thinking
English Literature

References

External links
The City School Pakistan official website

Cambridge schools in Pakistan
Educational institutions established in 1978
School systems in Pakistan
1978 establishments in Pakistan